Facter (real name Fletcher Anderson)  is a Melbourne based, Australian multi-disciplinary artist, toy maker, writer and curator, best known for his colourful, strange creatures rendered in a illustrative style. His work has featured in numerous publications, His practice encompasses street art (murals, paste-ups and stickers), designer toys, painting, illustration, publishing, and writing, and he has painted murals across five continents, in countries such as Australia, USA, Mexico, Taiwan, Guatemala, Norway, Poland, Latvia, Hungary, Indonesia, Singapore, and Malaysia.

Biography

Early life
Facter has been involved in street art and graffiti since 1990 and began as a graffiti artist in Perth, Western Australia. After several years hiatus from graffiti, he returned in 2007 with paste-ups and stickers and began producing larger-scale works again after relocating to Melbourne in 2008.

Career
Alongside his art he has been featured in several documentaries  and TV shows  on street art in Australia. In 2016, Facter started the designer toy label Irikanji, based on his work as an artist. The creatures within the Irikanji urban vinyl line inhabit a realm called The Known. Alongside his visual art practice, Facter is the creator, editor and chief writer for the Invurt.com website. Invurt maintains news of exhibitions and events, interviews and photography of street art across Australia, New Zealand and South East Asia.

Other abilities
Alongside his co-host Ariana Leane, Facter is the producer and host of Invurtion, a weekly podcast on arts and artists around the Melbourne and Australian area.

As an arts writer, he was responsible for coining the term "paintspotting", a portmanteau word now widely used for photographers and street art enthusiasts who capture new street art, much like "trainspotters".

Achievements
Facter is a well-known figure for his advocacy of street art and graffiti in Australia, he has written articles on street art in Australia, as well as on issues of copyright.
In 2012 he was involved in the overturning of a proposal to install CCTV cameras in Hosier Lane, and in the opening of the lane way from a permit-based painting zone to one that allowed artists to paint without permission.

Notable works
Under the Invurt banner, Facter has been responsible for the production of a wide range of large-scale paintings productions in Melbourne. In 2013, alongside Land Of Sunshine and Just Another Agency and the National Gallery of Victoria produced 'All Your Walls', a large-scale repainting of the entirety of Hosier Lane involving over 150 artists including him. From 2012 - 2014 Facter curated over 100 artists in the creation of Artist Lane in the City of Stonnington, under the Aerosol Alley events banner. He assisted in the production of the 2016 graffiti event “Meeting Of Styles Melbourne”, also under the Invurt banner. Facter was the chief curator, alongside Dean Sunshine, David Russell and Luke McManus for the Melbourne publication of the Google Street Art art project.
Alongside Jo Jette, Facter was the co-editor for the short-lived print publication Damnit! magazine. Facter also worked as a freelance writer for XPress Magazine, Knowledge Magazine, and Drum magazine, for which he wrote hundreds of articles and interviews on electronic music artists.

References

External links
 Official Invurt website
 Official Irikanji website
 Damn It! magazine
 CutBack official website
 
 Melbourne Street Art by Land of Sunshine at Google Cultural Institute

Street artists
Australian artists
Living people
Year of birth missing (living people)